Péter Bod or Peter Bod (February 22, 1712 – 1768) was a Hungarian theologian and historian.

Biography
Bod was born Feb. 22, 1712, at Felső-Csernáton, in Transylvania. He studied at Nagy-Enyed, where he also was appointed librarian and professor of Hebrew. In 1740 he went to Leyden to complete his theological studies. After his return, in 1743, he was appointed chaplain to the countess Teleki, and in 1749 he was called to Magyar-Igen as pastor of the Reformed Church, and died there in 1768.

In his native language he wrote, History of the Reformed Bishops of Transylvania (Nagy-Enyed, 1766); in Latin he published, Hungarorum quorumdam Principum ex Epitaphiis Renovata of Memoria (2 vols. 1764- 1766): — Historia Unitariorum in Transylvania (posthumous, Leyden, 1781).

References

External links 
 Bod Péter

1712 births
1768 deaths
People from Covasna County
Hungarian librarians
Hungarian Calvinist and Reformed clergy
18th-century Hungarian people